Eight Heroes is a 2006 wuxia television series directed and written by Wong Jing, starring Anthony Wong, Damian Lau, Lu Yi, Li Bingbing, Li Xiaolu, Dong Xuan, Zheng Xiaodong, Lam Chi-chung, Edison Chen, Fan Bingbing, and Han Xiao.

Plot
The story is set in China during the Southern Song dynasty. Emperor Gaozong is deceived by the treacherous premier Qin Hui and he relieves most of his commanders-in-chiefs and puts one, Yue Fei, to death. Qin Hui's party dominates the imperial court, leading to widespread corruption in the government. Some righteous ministers oppose Qin Hui but do not dare to challenge him directly, so they form the secret organisation Haoxia to undermine his influence. Eight people with special skills and abilities receive invitations to join Haoxia and their heroic quest begins. The plot's development is based on several loosely connected subplots, and ends with a grand finale of a showdown between the heroes and Qin Hui's forces.

Cast
 Anthony Wong as Yan Tiexin
 Damian Lau as Guan Yulou
 Lu Yi as Ping Chang
 Li Bingbing as Feng Laiyi
 Li Xiaolu as Le Qianqian
 Dong Xuan as Bian Suwen
 Zheng Xiaodong as Feng Yizhen
 Lam Chi-chung as Dongguo Ren
 Edison Chen as Xie Jiaqi
 Fan Bingbing as Chu Xiangxiang
 Han Xiao as Di Sanniang
 Li Guohua as Qin Hui
 Chen Zhihui as Meng Tianwen
 Wu Qingzhe as Crown prince
 Tian Min as Empress
 Shen Lan as Lianhua
 Xie Yuanjiang as Fang Dongyue
 Cao Zheng as Yang Chen
 Zhou Zhong as Blood Bat
 Zhou Ying as Xi Ning
 Zhang Liang as Gu Beichuan
 Liu Yiwei as Lai San
 Wei Hua as Zhuge Chaoming
 Ni Zengzhao as Wen Yaonan
 Chen Ke as Jia Dapeng
 Sun Mengmeng as Jingrong
 Ma Ji as Liu Qing
 Huang Wei as Tianji Old Man
 Guo Hongjie as Eagle King
 Chen Tao as Qin Xi
 Qian Youyou as Feng Yizhen's mother

External links
  Eight Heroes on Sina.com

2006 Chinese television series debuts
Chinese wuxia television series
Television series set in the Southern Song
Mandarin-language television shows